Ape Escape: Pumped and Primed, known in Japan as Gacha Mecha Stadium Saru Battle (ガチャメカスタジアム　サルバト～レ), is a video game developed by Japan Studio and published by Sony Computer Entertainment in Japan and Ubisoft in North America exclusively for PlayStation 2. It is the fourth title in the Ape Escape franchise. It was never released in Europe, despite being advertised in the UK and Australia.

Gameplay
Spike, Natalie, Casi and the Professor join the High-tech Tournament, a virtual world. Helga, the previous champion, is on an important mission to find the disk based on her father's research, hidden in the trophy. Unlike other Ape Escape games, this game is more of a party game, similar to Mario Party and Sonic Shuffle. The game consists of a series of competitive minigames using various vehicles and gadgets from previous Ape Escape games, such as battling underwater using submersibles, racing on foot, and collecting the most coins. The story mode is broken up into different tournaments with 3 to 4 players, where 1 to 2 players must finish at least 1st place to pass.

Reception

The game received average scores, rating a Metacritic of 61. Reviewers pointed that its high qualities lie in its visual and sound effects, and on its game mechanics, but it lacks re-playability and overall appeal.

References

External links
Official website (Japanese)
Ape Escape: Pumped & Primed, IGN
Ape Escape: Pumped & Primed (YouTube)

2004 video games
Ape Escape games
Multiplayer and single-player video games
Party video games
PlayStation 2 games
PlayStation 2-only games
Video games developed in Japan
Video games with cel-shaded animation
Ubisoft games